Sumichrastia is a genus of bristle flies in the family Tachinidae.

Species
Sumichrastia aurea (Giglio-Tos, 1893)

References

Dexiinae
Diptera of North America
Tachinidae genera
Taxa named by Charles Henry Tyler Townsend